Century City is a  mixed-use development in Makati, Philippines being developed by Century Properties. Several of the Philippines' upscale and tallest buildings, namely The Gramercy Residences, The Milano Residences, The Knightsbridge Residences, and Trump Tower Manila are located here, as well as the  Century City Mall. Once completed, the ₱40 Billion Century City complex will comprise an office building for business process outsourcing and corporate companies, four luxury residential towers, a mixed-use building, a mall, and an IT Hospital.

The land the development sits on was the former site of International School Manila. It was purchased in 2006 by a consortium composed of Century Properties Inc. and Picar Holdings. Construction of the development began in 2007.

Location
Century City is located on a  site at Kalayaan Avenue formerly occupied by the International School Manila for over 40 years. It occupies a significant portion of the old downtown area of Makati being redeveloped along Makati Avenue just north of the Makati Central Business District. It lies between Valdez Street and Kalayaan Avenue to the north and south, and between Salamanca Street and Spring Street to the east and west.

Century City Mall

Century City Mall is the retail anchor for the Century City complex.  It is a boutique mall and lifestyle center which has 17,000 square meters of leasable space for around 100 tenants. It is anchored by Rustan's Supermarket and a four-screen digital cinema. The five-level shopping mall also contains several restaurants and bars, including the 12 Monkeys Music Hall and Pub located on the mall's rooftop. It was completed in 2014.

Centuria Medical
The Centuria Medical Makati, completed in 2017, is a hospital featuring IT-based facilities and amenities, and is managed and operated in a joint-venture partnership with Centuria Medical. The Centuria Medical is a stand-alone, out-patient surgical facility that caters to the needs of specialties such as Plastic Reconstructive and Aesthetic/Cosmetic Surgery, Dermatology, ENT-HNS, Gastroenterology, OB-GYN, Ophthalmology, Orthopedics and Urology, housing over 500 highly skilled and board certified doctors from different medical practices.

Residential and office projects
Residential buildings
 The Gramercy Residences
 Trump Tower Manila
 The Knightsbridge Residences
 Milano Residences
 Century Spire

Office buildings
 Forbes Media Tower (now Century Diamond Tower) - a ₱5 Billion office building, in collaboration with Forbes and the Mitsubishi Corporation. The building is currently topped off, and is expected to be completed in 2021.

References

Mixed-use developments in Metro Manila
Makati